Football 5-a-side at the 2020 Summer Paralympics was held at the Aomi Urban Sports Venue in Tokyo.

The 2020 Summer Olympic and Paralympic Games were postponed to 2021 due to the COVID-19 pandemic. They kept the 2020 name and were held from 24 August to 5 September 2021.

Qualifying
There are 8 men's teams who compete in the competition. Each team must have a maximum of fifteen squad members: eight outfield players, two goalkeepers with the other members being one guide, one coach with an assistant coach, along with a doctor and physiotherapist.

Schedule

Squads

Medalists

Preliminary round

Group A

Group B

Knock-out stage

Bracket

7th–8th classification matches

5th–6th classification matches

Semi-finals

Bronze medal match

Gold medal match

Final rankings

See also
Football at the 2020 Summer Olympics

References

External links
Results book 

Football 5-a-side at the Summer Paralympics
International association football competitions hosted by Japan
2020 Summer Paralympics events
Football 5-a-side at the 2020 Summer Paralympics